Ripogonum elseyanum, commonly known as hairy supplejack, is a climbing vine, or sometimes a shrub, native to coastal rainforests of New South Wales and Queensland, Australia.

The species was named by Mueller to honour the surgeon and naturalist, Joseph Ravenscroft Elsey (1834–1857), who was with Mueller on the 1856 expedition led by Augustus Gregory.

References

elseyanum
Flora of New South Wales
Flora of Queensland
Taxa named by Ferdinand von Mueller